The Department of Advanced Education and Labour was a part of the Government of New Brunswick.  It was charged with the administration of post-secondary education and the enforcement of labour standards and facilitating relations between employers and employees in New Brunswick. The department took over the responsibilities of the Department of Labour and the Department of Advanced Education and Training in 1991. In 1998, the department's functions were split between the Department of Labour and the Department of Education.

Ministers

References 

Defunct New Brunswick government departments and agencies